Rana hanluica is a species of frog in the family Ranidae, the "true frogs". It is endemic to China and is known from the mountains of southwestern Hunan and northeastern Guizhou. It is locally common.

References

hanluica
Frogs of China
Endemic fauna of China
Amphibians described in 2007